RS-67,333 is a drug which has been investigated as a potential rapid-acting antidepressant, nootropic, and treatment for Alzheimer's disease. It is a high-affinity 5-HT4 receptor partial agonist, as well as a sigma receptor ligand of both subtypes to a lesser extent.

References

Anilines
Piperidines
5-HT4 agonists
Sigma agonists
Aromatic ketones
Chlorobenzenes
Phenol ethers